The Dean of Yale Law School serves as the administrative head of the law school of Yale University. Since the office's establishment in 1873, there have been 17 deans of the school.  

The current dean, Heather K. Gerken, entered the office in 2017, succeeding Robert C. Post.

List of deans of Yale Law School 
Source:

References

See also
Law school dean